Alexander Donski (born 1 August 1998) is a Bulgarian tennis player.

Donski has a career high ATP singles ranking of No. 525 achieved on 11 April 2022 and a career high doubles ranking of No. 248 achieved on 3 October 2022.  In singles, Donski has won two ITF World Tour titles and in doubles he won ten.

YouTube 
Alexander is known for his YouTube channel called Operation Liftoff with Lazar Dokov, his cousin and fellow professional player/coach. The duo travel Europe to play in futures tournaments in a vlog style of video. They showcase the life an ITF Junior has to endure to succeed. The channel has over 5000 subscribers.

Junior career
Donski reached a career high ITF junior ranking of 92 on 24 October 2016.He has compiled a Win/Loss record of 50-39 in Singles and 33-40 in Doubles.

Professional career

2017-2020: Early Years: Turning Pro, ATP debut
Donski turned professional in 2017 and finished the year ranked No. 1578 in the ATP singles rankings.

Donski made his ATP main draw debut at the 2018 Diema Xtra Sofia Open, receiving a wildcard into both the singles and doubles tournament.
By the end of 2018, Donski jumped 147 places to finish the 2018 season ranked No. 1431 in the ATP Singles rankings while finishing the year ranked 1061 in the ATP Doubles rankings.

In singles, his breakthrough on the ITF World Tennis Tour circuit came in 2019, when he reached a total of four ITF finals. He ended up as a runner-up at the M15 events in Sozopol, Telavi and Johannesburg before eventually winning his first ITF title in Pretoria after a three tiebreak sets win over Arthur Cazaux. During the season Donski also won his first two ITF doubles titles in Telavi and Pretoria as well as reaching his first ATP quarterfinal with Alexandar Lazarov at the 2019 Sofia Open.

In 2020 the Bulgarian received a wild card into the singles qualifying draw and the doubles main draw of the 2020 Sofia Open, but ended his participation in both with straight set losses in the opening round.

2021-2022: First ATP qualification win, top 250 debut in doubles

Donski's first singles win at the ATP level came at the 2021 Sofia Open, where he received another wild card for the qualifying draw and pulled an upset win over eighth seed Jurij Rodionov before losing to Andreas Seppi in the final round. Alexander also played in the doubles competition at his home ATP tournament with Dimitar Kuzmanov, but the Bulgarian duo lost in a third set tiebreaker to eventual champions Jonny O'Mara and Ken Skupski.

At the end of the 2021 season Donski started his rise in the doubles rankings with three more ITF titles, winning the trophy at the M15 event in Sozopol with Billy Harris and following it up with triumphs at the M25 events in Saint-Dizier and Villers-lès-Nancy with Petros Tsitsipas.

In January 2022, the Bulgarian continued his streak in doubles at a series of M25 events in Monastir and after 12 consecutive wins he added another trophy to his collection. In the following months Donski reached two more ITF singles finals in Tunisia, losing the first one to Laurent Lokoli before claiming his second singles title against Térence Atmane in March.

In the coming months Alexander won two more ITF doubles titles in Sarajevo and Alkmaar as well as also reaching three ATP Challenger Tour quarterfinals. At the 2022 Sofia Open the Bulgarian lost in the first qualifying round in singles, but he once again reached the quarterfinals in doubles with Alexandar Lazarov and made his top 250 debut in the ATP doubles rankings on 3 October 2022.

Challenger and Futures/World Tennis Tour Finals

Singles: 6 (2–4)

Doubles: 17 (10–7)

National participation

Davis Cup (3 wins, 2 losses)
Alexander Donski debuted for the Bulgaria Davis Cup team in 2019. Since then he has 6 nominations with 5 ties played, his singles W/L record is 1–0 and doubles W/L record is 2–2 (3–2 overall).

   indicates the result of the Davis Cup match followed by the score, date, place of event, the zonal classification and its phase, and the court surface.

References

External links
 
 
 

1998 births
Living people
Bulgarian male tennis players
21st-century Bulgarian people